Terrace Mountain (elev. ) is a mountain peak in the Gallatin Range in Yellowstone National Park in Park County, Wyoming, United States. Terrace Mountain was named by the 1878 Hayden Geological Survey because of its proximity to the travertine terraces at Mammoth and because it too is an ancient travertine terrace. The mountain has also been known as "Soda Mountain" and "White Mountain".

Although there are no maintained trails to the summit, Terrace Mountain is flanked within  by the Snow Pass, Fawn Pass and Hoodoo trails.

See also

 List of mountains of Wyoming
 Mountains and mountain ranges of Yellowstone National Park

References

External links

Mountains of Wyoming
Mountains of Yellowstone National Park
Mountains of Park County, Wyoming